Jacob Olesen (born 1 February 1981) is a Danish football striker, who currently plays for the Danish Superliga side Viborg FF.

He came to Viborg FF from SønderjyskE in January 2006. In the first months of the 2006-07 Superliga season, Olesen was Viborg's top goal scorer with five goals, all on headers. He suffered a severe dislocation of the left ankle in an October 2006 game, and was out for 6 months.

External links
Career statistic at Danmarks Radio

Living people
1981 births
Danish men's footballers
Association football forwards
Danish Superliga players
Danish 1st Division players
SønderjyskE Fodbold players
Viborg FF players
People from Haderslev Municipality
Sportspeople from the Region of Southern Denmark